The Macedonian Handball Federation (Macedonian: Ракометна федерација на Македонија) commonly known by its acronym, RFM, is the national governing body of handball in North Macedonia. Its headquarters are in Skopje and it reestablish its membership as a single Republic of the EHF and IHF in 1993. Macedonian Handball Federation is responsible for the organization and governance of handball's major local championships in the country and also runs the Macedonian Men's and Women's national teams.

It organizes the following leagues:
 Men's VIP Super league
 Women's Skopsko Super league
 "I league"
 Mladinska liga
 WINNER Kadetska liga
 SPARKASSE Pionerska liga

International events organised by the Macedonian Handball Federation 

In 2008 the Macedonian Handball Federation organised the European Women's Handball Championship. 
The Macedonian Handball Federation was host of:
 Women's Junior Handball World Championship - 2003
 Men's Junior Handball Championship - 2007
 Women's Junior Handball Championship - 2008
 2008 European Women's Handball Championship
 Women's Youth World Handball Championship - 2014
 European Women's U-17 Handball Championship - 2015
 2022 European Women's Handball Championship

External links
Macedonian Handball Federation
European Handball Federation
8th Women's Handball European Championship 2008 in the Republic of Macedonia
EHF Women's EURO 2008

References

Handball in North Macedonia
Macedonia
Sports organizations established in 1949
Handball